Santa María de Toloño, also known as Our Lady of los Ángeles, is a ruined Spanish monastery located in the Sierra de Toloño near Labastida, Álava. Constructed by the Hieronymites, the monastery was destroyed in the First Carlist War and only a few walls remain.

History
It was built by the Hieronymites between the 14th and 15th centuries, and abandoned in 1422 due to harsh weather. Later, it was affiliated with the Hermandad de la Divisa (Brotherhood of the Currency) until the end of 18th century. In 1835, during the First Carlist war, it suffered a fire that left only a part of the Baroque chapel standing.

Architecture and fittings 
The building was well-constructed, with church, camarín and sacristía. Its retablo mayor were of white stone. There were 22 rooms, five kitchens, separate rooms for a chaplain, two hermits and a servant, as well as a meeting room for the Divisa.

References

Bibliography 
 De Sigüenza, José (1544). CAPITVLO XXXII. Historia de la Orden de San Jerónimo. Pages 155–156. (in Spanish)
 Hergueta and Martin, Domingo (1906). Noticias históricas de la muy noble y muy leal ciudad de Haro (1979 edition). Logroño: Publications Service of the Provincial Council of Logroño. . (in Spanish)
 Goicolea Julián, Francisco Javier (1999). Haro: una villa riojana del linaje Velasco a fines del Medievo (1999 edition). Logroño: Ediciones Instituto de Estudios Riojanos. Page 362, . (in Spanish)

External links

Hieronymite monasteries
Christian monasteries in Spain
Christian monasteries established in the 14th century
Church ruins in Spain
Churches in Álava